Jianshan District is a district and the seat of the city of Shuangyashan, Heilongjiang province, People's Republic of China.

Administrative divisions 
Jianshan District is divided into 7 subdistricts and 1 township. 
7 subdistricts
 Ermalu, Bamalu, Zhongxinzhan, Fu'an, Yaode, Chang'an, Tiexi
1 township
 Anbang

Notes and references 

Jianshan
Shuangyashan